Codariocalyx is a genus of flowering plants in the legume family, Fabaceae. It belongs to the subfamily Faboideae. This genus has been largely debated with the genus Desmodium on whether they are separate or the same genus.

References

Desmodieae
Fabaceae genera